Princeton is the county seat and largest city of Mercer County, Missouri, United States. The population was 1,007 at the 2020 census, down from the 2010 census, which counted 1,166 people. Princeton, Missouri was also the birthplace of the famous frontierswoman Calamity Jane.

Geography
Princeton is located at  (40.398794, -93.585807).

Climate
Princeton has a hot-summer humid continental climate (Köppen Dfa). Summers are often hot and humid whereas winters are dry with days averaging above freezing in all months, which means sparse snow cover in spite of the cold overnight temperatures.

History

Princeton was platted in 1846.  The city was named in commemoration of the Battle of Princeton in the American Revolutionary War. A post office has been in operation at Princeton since 1846.

The Herbert Cain and Corah Brantley Casteel House and Leo Ellis Post No. 22, American Legion Building are listed on the National Register of Historic Places.

Demographics

2010 census
As of the census of 2010, there were 1,166 people, 525 households, and 282 families living in the city. The racial makeup of the city was 98.9% White, 0.3% African American, 0.2% Native American, 0.2% Asian, 0.3% from other races, and 0.2% from two or more races. Hispanic or Latino of any race were 0.8% of the population.

There were 525 households, of which 28.2% had children under the age of 18 living with them, 40.2% were married couples living together, 10.1% had a female householder with no husband present, 3.4% had a male householder with no wife present, and 46.3% were non-families. 41.9% of all households were made up of individuals, and 22.4% had someone living alone who was 65 years of age or older. The average household size was 2.12 and the average family size was 2.91.

The median age in the city was 40.3 years. 24.4% of residents were under the age of 18; 6.6% were between the ages of 18 and 24; 23.4% were from 25 to 44; 20.8% were from 45 to 64; and 24.6% were 65 years of age or older. The gender makeup of the city was 47.7% male and 52.3% female.

2000 census
As of the census of 2000, there were 1,047 people, 499 households, and 271 families living in the city. The population density was 660.5 people per square mile (254.2/km). There were 566 housing units at an average density of 357.0 per square mile (137.4/km). The racial makeup of the city was 98.85% White, 0.10% African American, 0.67% Native American, and 0.38% from two or more races. Hispanic or Latino of any race were 0.29% of the population.

There were 499 households, out of which 26.1% had children under the age of 18 living with them, 41.1% were married couples living together, 8.8% had a female householder with no husband present, and 45.5% were non-families. 42.9% of all households were made up of individuals, and 30.1% had someone living alone who was 65 years of age or older. The average household size was 2.05 and the average family size was 2.79.

In the city, the population was spread out, with 22.7% under the age of 18, 7.3% from 18 to 24, 21.7% from 25 to 44, 19.9% from 45 to 64, and 28.5% who were 65 years of age or older. The median age was 44 years. For every 100 females there were 77.8 males. For every 100 females age 18 and over, there were 75.1 males.

The median income for a household in the city was $27,059, and the median income for a family was $39,125. Males had a median income of $29,583 versus $19,327 for females. The per capita income for the city was $15,485. About 14.3% of families and 17.3% of the population were below the poverty line, including 22.9% of those under age 18 and 15.8% of those age 65 or over.

Education
Princeton is home to the Princeton R-V School District which consists of an elementary school (K-6), a junior high school (grades 7–8) and Princeton High School (grades 9-12).

Princeton has a public library, the Mercer County Library.

Notable people
 Arthur M. Hyde, governor and U.S. Secretar of Agriculture
 Calamity Jane, also known as Martha Jane Cannary, frontierswoman
 Christopher Langan, a man who has been described as "the smartest man in America" by the media. 
 Ira B. Hyde , U.S. Congressman 1873–1875. 
 Laurance M. Hyde, Missouri Supreme Court judge 
 Mervin Kelly, physicist at Bell Labs 
 Russ Derry, MLB baseball player.
 Minnetta Theodora Taylor (1860-1911), author, poet, polyglot, clubwoman, suffragist

References

External links
 Historic maps of Princeton in the Sanborn Maps of Missouri Collection at the University of Missouri

Cities in Mercer County, Missouri
County seats in Missouri
Cities in Missouri